Police Ladies Football Club is a Ghanaian professional women's football club based in Accra in the Greater Accra Region of Ghana. The club features in the Ghana Women's Premier League.

History 
The Police Ladies football club was formed by the Ghana Police Service in 2007. The club won the Ghana Women's FA Cup in 2016 after defeating Fabulous Ladies by 2–1 in the final.

Grounds 
The club plays their home matches at the McDan La Town Park. In May 2020, the club announced the construction of an artificial turf at the Police Training and Academy School in Tesano, Accra.

Honours

Domestic 

 Ghana Women's FA Cup

Management

Notable players 
For details on notable Police Ladies F.C. footballers see Category:Police Ladies F.C. (Ghana) players.

See also 

 Women's football in Ghana
 Sekondi Hasaacas F.C.
 Ampem Darkoa Ladies F.C.

References

External links 

 Official Website
 Police Ladies on Facebook
 Police Ladies on Global Sports Archive

2007 establishments in Ghana
Association football clubs established in 2007
Women's football clubs in Ghana